Dashtok-e Sofla (also Romanized as Dashtok-e Soflá and Dashtak Sofla; also known as Dashtok-e Pā’īn) is a village in Pishkuh Rural District, in the Central District of Taft County, Yazd Province, Iran. At the 2006 census, its population was 31, in 17 families.

References 

Populated places in Taft County